My Island is the tenth full-length album by Starflyer 59. It was released September 12, 2006 on Tooth & Nail Records.

A music video for "I Win" was released online to coincide with the album's release. This was the first video the band released since the video for "I Like Your Photographs", from the 2001 album Leave Here a Stranger.

Track listing

Personnel
Jason Martin guitars, vocals
Josh Dooley guitars, keyboards
Steven Dail bass
Trevor Monks drums
Trey Many drums

References 

2006 albums
Starflyer 59 albums
Tooth & Nail Records albums